The following is a list of the municipalities (comuni) of Piedmont, Italy.

There are 1,181 municipalities in Piedmont (as of January 2019):

187 in the Province of Alessandria
118 in the Province of Asti
74 in the Province of Biella
247 in the Province of Cuneo
87 in the Province of Novara
312 in the Metropolitan City of Turin
74 in the Province of Verbano-Cusio-Ossola
82 in the Province of Vercelli

List

See also
List of municipalities of Italy

References

 
Geography of Piedmont
Piedmont